Minuscule 217 (in the Gregory-Aland numbering), ε 233  (Soden), is a Greek minuscule manuscript of the New Testament, on parchment. Palaeographically it has been assigned to the 12th century. It has marginalia.

Description 

The codex contains a complete text of the four Gospels, on 299 parchment leaves (size ), with a commentary. The text is written in one column per page, 21 lines per page.

The text is divided according to the Ammonian Sections (in Mark 236 sections, the last in 16:12), whose numbers are given at the margin, but references to the Eusebian Canons are absent.

The manuscript has survived in good condition.

Text 

The Greek text of the codex is a representative of the Byzantine text-type. Aland placed it in Category V.

According to the Claremont Profile Method it belongs to the textual cluster 16. It creates pair with 578 in Luke 1 and Luke 10. Textually it is close to the manuscripts 16, 119, 330, 491, 578, 693, 1528, and 1588. They create Group 16 with following profile:
 Luke 1: 8, (9), 13, 23, 28, 34, 37, 43.
 Luke 10: 3, 7, 15, 19, 23, (25), 58, 63.
 Luke 20: 4, 13, 19, 50, 51, 54, 55, 62, 65. Codex 217 forms a pair with codex 578 in Luke 1 and 10. They lack readings 13 and 23 and add 48 in Luke 1, and lacks 20 in Luke 20.

History 

The manuscript was given in 1478 by Peter de Montagnana to the monastery of St. John, in Viridario, at Padua. It was examined by Friedrich Münter (for Birch) and Burgon. C. R. Gregory saw it in 1886.

It is currently housed at the Biblioteca Marciana (Gr. I,3 (944)), at Venice.

See also 
 List of New Testament minuscules
 Biblical manuscript
 Textual criticism

References

Further reading 

 

Greek New Testament minuscules
12th-century biblical manuscripts